Branovo is a municipality and village in the Nové Zámky District in the Nitra Region of south-west Slovakia.

History
In historical records the village was first mentioned in 1418.

Geography
The village lies at an altitude of 130 metres and covers an area of 9.321 km². It has a population of about 570 people.

Ethnicity
The population is about 97.5% Slovak and 2.5% Hungarian.

Facilities
The village has a public library and football pitch.

Genealogical resources

The records for genealogical research are available at the state archive "Statny Archiv in Nitra, Slovakia"

See also
 List of municipalities and towns in Slovakia

External links
 
 
https://web.archive.org/web/20070513023228/http://www.statistics.sk/mosmis/eng/run.html
Surnames of living people in Branovo
Branovo – Nové Zámky okolie

Villages and municipalities in Nové Zámky District